Sundarwati Nawal Prabhakar (1922–2010) was an Indian National Congress politician from Delhi. She represented Karol Bagh in the 8th Lok Sabha.

Early life
Sundarwati was born on 9 September 1922 in Delhi. She received education till the under-metric level.

Career
Sundarwati was involved in the Indian Independence movement and participated in the 1942 Quit India Movement. She volunteered for the Defence Fund during the Sino-Indian War (1962) and Indo-Pakistani War of 1965. In recognition for her social service, she was awarded a shield by the then Prime Minister of India. She was the director of Delhi Scheduled Castes Financial and Development Corporation and a member of the Delhi Metropolitan Council from 1972–80 and 1982–84. She won the 1980 Indian general election and represented Karol Bagh in the 8th Lok Sabha.

During her term as a Member of Parliamemt, Sunderwati served on the Committee on Private Members' Bills and Resolutions. She was also a member of the managing committee of the Shivaji College and the Social Welfare Board in Delhi.

Personal life
Sundarwati married INC politician Naval Prabhakar in 1936 and had eight children from him. She died on 24 March 2010 in Delhi.

References

1922 births
2010 deaths
India MPs 1984–1989
Women members of the Lok Sabha
Lok Sabha members from Delhi
Indian National Congress politicians from Delhi